Atikameg Lake station is a flag stop in Atikameg Lake, Manitoba, Canada located across Highway 287 from Pioneer Bay, Clearwater Lake.  The stop is served by Via Rail's Winnipeg – Churchill train.

References 

Via Rail stations in Manitoba